Leucania fiyu is a moth of the family Noctuidae. It was described by Márton Hreblay and Shin-Ichi Yoshimatsu in 1998. It is found on Fiji.

References

Moths described in 1998
Leucania